Morsand is a village in Sitamarhi district, Bihar state, India.  It is situated 18 km. to the southeast of the town of Sitamarhi on the banks of the river - Lakhandei, and is connected to the district headquarters via National Highway 77 Sitamarhi- Hajipur.  The nearest railway stations are Sitamarhi (about 18 km) and Muzaffarpur (about 35 km), and the nearest airport is in Patna (about 110 km). Now a new railway station is established in the village itself with the name "Runni Saidpur", which will be providing rail connectivity from this village to the rest of India.

The average height of the village from sea level is 75 meters.  There are a number of temples in the village, three of which are devoted to Lord Rama-janki and Hanuman.  Most of the people here are religious.  Being in Mithila region, people of Morsand treat Goddess Sita as their sister and Lord Rama as brother-in-law. People of this village believed to be migrated from Maner, a place near Patna. So they are also called "maneria".

Culture
It is located in at the confluence of Mithila and Vajji (Licchvians). Most of the people are either Maithils or Vajji.

Education

The village is famous for its standard of education in the district. Frequently some of the students from this village are admitted to prestigious institutions of India, like AIIMS, JIPMER, SMVDU, NIT, Indian Institutes of Technology, BSF, Air Force. There are many engineers, architects and doctors from this village.  There are a number of government and private schools which provide high-quality education to the students of Morsand and the nearby villages. Most important thing is that in almost every family there is a person who has teaching profession.

Crops
The major food crops are rice, wheat and maize (corn). Apart from this area is a major producer of sugarcane, tobacco and other cash crops. People here are very laborious. Lentils, sun flower and mustard are also grown in this area. Crops and agriculture have given rise to many agro-based industries in this area.

Industry
The most important agricultural products are sugarcane, rice, paddy, wheat, lentils, maize, pointed gourd, potatoes, bananas, onions, mangoes and milk.

Festival
Festivals celebrated in the village include Jhula (in the month of sawan), Chhath, Diwali, Durgapuja and Holi. The major festival of this area is Chhath puja in which people offer their prayer to Lord Sun. Almost all the people wherever they are, their major desire is to celebrate Chhath puja at their home with their family members and villagers. Holi and Diwali are other two festivals celebrated with so much of gaiety. Other festivals such as Dusshera, makar sakranti (Tila Sakraat) are also celebrated with full enjoyment. Among all festival celebrated here what remains common is enjoyment, co-operation and brotherhood. Sawan mela on the banks of lakhandai is worth watching. On this day, girls play Sama for the last time in the month of Karthik.
Balusahi sweetmeat of Runni saidpur is famous which is used in every festival by villagers.

Crops
The major food crops are rice, wheat and maize. Apart from it this area is major producers of sugarcane, tobacoo and other cash crops. People here are very laborious. Lentils, sun flower and mustard is also grown in this area. Crop and agriculture has given rise to many agro based industries in this area.

How to reach
The town is 35 km from Muzaffarpur, which is the biggest city of north Bihar and 25 km from Sitamarhi, its district headquarters.  24 hour bus service, both private operators and government, run BSRTC buses to provide connectivity to the village from Muzaffarpur, Patna and Sitamarhi. The village is connected to the train route as well . Daily passenger trains from Sitamarhi and Muzaffarpur has a stoppage at the railway station Runnisaidpur in the village .

References

Villages in Sitamarhi district